Soyuzplodoimport is a company based in Moscow. Its owns the trademarks of different types of vodka, including the Stolichnaya and Moskovskaya brands. The company also markets canned herrings under its Stolichnaya brand as part of a partnership with Russian Sea Group.

Soyuzplodoimport was established in 1966 to import food items, including cocoa beans, coffee, spices and vegetables, and to export vodka. The company was not privatized, and remained under state ownership in the post-Soviet era.

In 1997, its then-president Yuri Shefler formed a new private company, Soyuzplodimport (almost the same name as the government-owned company, minus an 'o'). The new private entity then purchased some of Russia's main vodka brands from the government-owned Soyuzplodoimport for $300,000. An investigation by the Audit Commission valued the trademarks at $400 million, and in October 2001 a Russian court ruled Soyuzplodoimport was illegally privatized, and restored 17 vodka brands under its ownership.

In 2015, Soyuzplodoimport managed to win court cases against Shefler and regain control of the brand in the Netherlands, Belgium and Luxembourg, but the decision was not final.

References

External links
 

Drink companies of Russia
Drink companies of the Soviet Union
Food and drink companies based in Moscow
Ministry of Foreign Trade (Soviet Union)
Government-owned companies of Russia